Cliff Street is a  street in Fremantle, Western Australia. It is the furthest west cross street on High Street, running parallel to Mouat Street. It is also at the south western edge of University of Notre Dame campus buildings.  It is part of the Fremantle West End Heritage area, which was established in late 2016.

Heritage buildings found along Cliff Street include:
 Former Bank of New South Wales building on the corner of High Street, constructed in 1899.
 Commissariat Buildings, corner of Marine Terrace, built in 1853.
 Fremantle Customs House on the corner of Phillimore Street, built in 1908.
 Hotel Fremantle on the corner of High Street, built in 1899.
 McDonald Smith Building, built in 1895.
 Union Bank building, on the corner of High Street, built in 1889.
 Wilhelmsen House on the corner of Phillimore Street, built in 1902.

References

 
Streets in Fremantle